"Only Want You" is a song recorded and written by American singer/actress Skylar Stecker. The track, produced by Tricky Stewart, reached number one on Billboard's Dance Club Songs chart in its September 2, 2017 issue, giving Stecker her second number-one, her first being a cover of "Sweet Dreams" with JX Riders in 2016.

Track listings
Single
"Only Want You" (original) – 3:21  

Remixes
Only Want You (Dave Aude Extended Remix) 
Only Want You (Dave Aude Radio Edit) 
Only Want You (Dave Aude Dub) 
Only Want You (Dave Aude Dub Dub) 
Only Want You (Alex Acosta Remix) 
Only Want You (Alex Acosta Dub) 
Only Want You (Richard Vission & Loren Moore Remix)

References

External links
Track listing at iTunes
Track listing at Dirty Remixes
Official video at YouTube

2017 songs
2017 singles
Dance-pop songs
Cherrytree Records singles
Interscope Records singles
Song recordings produced by Tricky Stewart